Mallotojaponin may refer to:
 Mallotojaponin B
 Mallotojaponin C